Metropolis RFC is an American rugby team based in Minneapolis. The flagship team plays in the Midwest Rugby Premiership, with an additional side playing in Division II.

History
The club was founded in 1992 after the merger of Minneapolis RFC (founded 1960) and Metro RFC (founded 1980).

Honors
Midwest Rugby Premiership (USA Rugby Division I Midwest Conference)
2017USA Rugby Division III'''
2011 (win by B-team)

Notable former players
 Nate Osborne
 Joe Scheitlin

External links
Metropolis RFC

American rugby union teams
Rugby clubs established in 1992
Sports in Minneapolis